Bennetts Bayou is a stream in the U.S. states of Arkansas and Missouri. The stream source is in Howell County, Missouri, just south of US Route 160 west of Hocomo. The stream flows southwest into Ozark County, Missouri, and under Missouri Route 142 on the east side of Bakersfield. It then flows south through the extreme northwest corner of Fulton County, Arkansas, and into the northwest corner of Baxter County, Arkansas. It continues to the southwest and enters the northeast arm of Norfork Lake to the east of Gamaliel, Arkansas. The similarly named Bennetts River runs subparallel to Bennetts Bayou just to the southeast.

Bennetts Bayou has the name of the local Bennett  family.

See also
List of rivers of Arkansas
List of rivers of Missouri

References

Rivers of Baxter County, Arkansas
Rivers of Fulton County, Arkansas
Rivers of Howell County, Missouri
Rivers of Ozark County, Missouri
Rivers of Missouri
Rivers of Arkansas